MAHLE GmbH is a German automotive parts manufacturer based in Stuttgart, Germany. It is one of the largest automotive suppliers worldwide. As a manufacturer of components and systems for the combustion engine and its periphery, the company is one of the three largest systems suppliers worldwide for engine systems, filtration, electrics, mechatronics, and thermal management. In 2018, Mahle GmbH sales amounted to over €12.5 billion.

, its 71,000 employees work in 160+ production plants and 12 major research and development centers in  Germany, Great Britain, United States, Brazil, Japan, China, India, Poland, Spain, Slovenia. Worldwide, over 6000 development engineers and technicians work as partners for MAHLE's customers on new products and systems.

History

Formation
In 1920 the engineer and pilot Hellmuth Hirth established together with others a small workshop in Cannstatt, where he developed and constructed a two-stroke engine.

26-year-old Hermann Mahle started working for Hellmuth Hirth on 1 December 1920 as the company's seventh employee. The workshop was then called "Versuchsbau Hellmuth Hirth". 1 December 1920 is acknowledged as the birthday of today's MAHLE Group. It soon became clear that the workshop would not survive by only conducting engine tests. So the need arose to build a profitable line of production in order to finance ongoing engine tests. At that time, in the automobile production, pistons were generally made of cast iron. Versuchsbau Hellmuth Hirth decided to attempt to build light alloy pistons for combustion engines.

On 1 November 1922 Hermann Mahle's brother, Ernst Mahle, joined the factory as Head of Engineering. In 1924 the company merged with Chemische Fabrik Griesheim-Elektron, the inventors of the magnesium alloy Elektron, and was renamed Elektronmetall GmbH.

In 1927, the company developed the first controlled-expansion piston in Germany and in 1931, the world's first aluminium ring carrier piston for Diesel engines. Following this, piston technology was steadily improved.

In 1931, aero engine manufacturing was split off as a separate company, Hirth-Moroten GmbH.

In 1938 the conversion into MAHLE KG took place and the new company logo was introduced. The company expanded, and before WW2 it was the only company in Germany manufacturing die-cast magnesium alloy products. During the war, the Bad Cannstatt company made alloy pistons ranging from those for small cars to pistons with a 40 cm bore for submarine engines (such as the 522 litre diesel MAN M9V 40/46). The Fellbach plant accounted for 70% of Germany's output of magnesium, aluminium and zinc alloy pressure die castings.

After 1945 new products were developed and produced (e.g., aluminium cylinders with Cromal (chrome plating) surface coatings in 1951).

In 1964, the company founders Hermann and Ernst Mahle decided to waive private ownership in their companies and make the companies part of a foundation for public benefit. They renounced the largest part of their personal property and transferred the company shares to the MAHLE Foundation.

Aluminium engines
In 1976 MAHLE placed the first European aluminium engine blocks made in low-pressure die casting ready for series production. In 1988 the composite camshaft is enhanced to production standard, and in 2001 MAHLE presented a cooling concept for pistons in high-speed passenger car Diesel engines. The first all-plastic oil filter in the world followed in 2003. MAHLE developed and constructed its first complete engine in the same year, which was applied in the Formula Student.

Today, MAHLE is a predominant system supplier for components of piston systems, cylinder components, valve train systems, air management systems, and liquid management systems, for all well-known automobile manufacturers. In 2010, the MAHLE Group generated sales in excess of €5.2 billion. In 2017, the MAHLE Group generated sales in excess of €12.8 billion.

Organization 
, MAHLE GmbH consists of five business units and four profit centers.

Business units consist of:
 Engine Systems and Components: Produces pistons, cylinders, and related parts
 Filtration and Engine Peripherals: Produces filters, oil coolers and pumps
 Thermal Management: Produces cooling systems for batteries and powertrain components of electric cars
 Electronics and Mechatronics: electric drives, actuators and auxiliaries, and control and power electronics product groups
 Aftermarket: As its name suggest, produces spare parts and accessories for the automotive aftermarket sector

Management Board 
The Mahle Management Board consists of the following members:
 Arnd Franz (since 2022)
 Anke Felder (since 2020)
 Jumana Al-Sibai (since 2021)
 Wilhelm Emperhoff (since 2012)
 Georg Dietz (since 2018)
 Markus Kapaun (since 2022)
 Martin Weidlich (since 2020)

See also
 MAHLE Powertrain

References

Auto parts suppliers of Germany
Automotive transmission makers
Manufacturing companies established in 1920
Manufacturing companies based in Stuttgart
German brands
1920 establishments in Germany